The following are units which operated the Westland Lysander. In some cases, the Lysander was used in a secondary role for communications and was not the main equipment of the squadron.

Military operators

Australia
Royal Australian Air Force
No. 3 Squadron RAAF
No. 451 Squadron RAAF

British India
Royal Indian Air Force
No. 1 Squadron, Indian Air Force
No. 2 Squadron, Indian Air Force
No. 4 Squadron, Indian Air Force
No. 104 (GR) Squadron, Indian Air Force 
No. 1 Air Gunnery School (India)
No. 22 AACU

Burma
Burma Volunteer Air Force

Canada
Royal Canadian Air Force
No. 2 Squadron RCAF
No. 110 Squadron RCAF
No. 111 Squadron RCAF
No. 112 Squadron RCAF
No. 118 Squadron RCAF
No. 121 Squadron RCAF
No. 122 Squadron RCAF
No. 123 Squadron RCAF
No. 400 Squadron RCAF
No. 414 Squadron RCAF

Egypt
Royal Egyptian Air Force
 No. 1 (Army Cooperation) Squadron - 19 Mark I and a Mark III. From 1940-1943, thereafter used for target towing.

Finland
Finnish Air Force
No. 12 Squadron, Finnish Air Force
No. 14 Squadron, Finnish Air Force
No. 16 Squadron, Finnish Air Force

Free France
Free French Air Force

Ireland
Irish Air Corps
6 supplied in 1939

Poland
Polish Air Force in Great Britain
No. 309 "Land of Czerwien" Polish Fighter-Reconnaissance Squadron

Portugal
Portugal Air Force

South Africa
South African Air Force

Turkey
Turkish Air Force 
36 Mark II supplied in 1939

United Kingdom
Royal Air Force
No. 2 Squadron RAF
No. 4 Squadron RAF
No. 6 Squadron RAF
No. 13 Squadron RAF
No. 16 Squadron RAF
No. 20 Squadron RAF
No. 24 Squadron RAF
No. 26 Squadron RAF
No. 28 Squadron RAF
No. 81 Squadron RAF
No. 116 Squadron RAF
No. 135 Squadron RAF
No. 138 Squadron RAF
No. 148 Squadron RAF
No. 161 Squadron RAF
No. 173 Squadron RAF
No. 208 Squadron RAF
No. 225 Squadron RAF
No. 231 Squadron RAF
No. 237 Squadron RAF
No. 239 Squadron RAF
No. 241 Squadron RAF
No. 267 Squadron RAF
No. 268 Squadron RAF
No. 275 Squadron RAF
No. 276 Squadron RAF
No. 277 Squadron RAF
No. 278 Squadron RAF
No. 280 Squadron RAF
No. 285 Squadron RAF
No. 286 Squadron RAF
No. 287 Squadron RAF
No. 288 Squadron RAF
No. 289 Squadron RAF
No. 309 Polish Fighter-Reconnaissance Squadron
No. 357 Squadron RAF - Special Duties
No. 510 Squadron RAF
No. 516 Squadron RAF
No. 598 Squadron RAF
No. 613 Squadron RAF - Auxiliary Air Force equipped with Lysanders as main equipment.
No. 614 Squadron RAF - Auxiliary Air Force equipped with Lysanders as main equipment.
No. 679 Squadron RAF
No. 695 Squadron RAF
No. 6 Anti-Aircraft Co-operation Unit RAF
No. 7 Anti-Aircraft Co-operation Unit RAF

Fleet Air Arm

United States
United States Army Air Forces
 330th Bomb Squadron
 340th Bomb Squadron
 2025th Gunnery Flight
 2031st Gunnery Flight
 496th Fighter Training Group

References

Notes

Bibliography

 Hall, Alan W. Westland Lysander, Warpaint Series No.48. Luton, Bedfordshire, UK: Warpaint Books Ltd., 2005.
 Halley, James J. The Squadrons of the Royal Air Force & Commonwealth, 1918 -1988. Tonbridge, Kent, UK: Air Britain (Historians) Ltd., 1988. .

Lists of military units and formations by aircraft
Lysander
Royal Air Force lists